Fedor Vlasov (born 28 March 1984) is a Russian sports shooter. He competed in the men's 50 metre rifle three positions event at the 2016 Summer Olympics.

References

External links
 

1984 births
Living people
Russian male sport shooters
Olympic shooters of Russia
Shooters at the 2016 Summer Olympics
Place of birth missing (living people)
European Games competitors for Russia
Shooters at the 2015 European Games